Paul Pörtner (25 January 1925 – 16 November 1984) was a German playwright,
novelist, translator, and editor.

Life 

After completing a directorial apprenticeship at the municipal theatre of his native
Wuppertal, from 1951 Pörtner studied philosophy, plus German and French
literature, at the University of Cologne. He later continued his studies
in France. In 1958 he began earning a living as a professional author, and from
1976 on was permanently employed by Norddeutscher Rundfunk in Hamburg as a
director of radio plays.
 
His short stories and novels very often deal with social outsiders and the disadvantaged – as a young man,
he himself became physically handicapped during World War II. His work shows Pörtner to be a
writer who was also deeply drawn to burlesque, in which his characters act in desperate and irrational ways. He also consistently uses experimental language and wordplay.
 
His interest in avant-garde theatre led him to embrace the theories of Jacob Levy Moreno, Antonin Artaud and Erwin Piscator. In addition, through his stage work as director and playwright he fell under the charm of commedia dell'arte, as well as the absurdism of Kurt Schwitters and Alfred Jarry. In 1963 Pörtner wrote the interactive play Scherenschnitt oder Der Mörder sind Sie in which the audience takes a leading role. This was first performed the same year at Theater Ulm, and at least seventy-five other German theatres followed suit.

In the United States Scherenschnitt, rewritten and titled Shear Madness, became the longest-running, non-musical play in USA stage history. Productions in eighteen other countries have made Scherenschnitt an international hit: with the exception of Agatha Christie's The Mousetrap, Pörtner's interactive play is currently the longest-running play in the world.
 
In addition to his seventeen theatre plays, Pörtner wrote more than 20 radio plays that are still influential in the German-speaking world.

Selected works

Publications 

 Sternbild Selbstbild. Poems. Wuppertal 1958
 Schattensteine. Poems. Wuppertal 1958
 Wurzelwerk. Poems. Wuppertal 1960
 Experiment Theater. Chronik und Dokumente. Chronicles and documents. Zürich 1960
 Tobias Immergrün. Novel. Köln 1962
 Sophie Imperator. Drama. Köln 1964
 Scherenschnitt. Kriminalstück zum Mitspielen. Stage-play. Köln 1964
 Gestern. Novel. Köln 1965
 Einkreisung eines dicken Mannes. Erzählungen, Beschreibungen, Grotesken. Tales. Köln 1968
 Spontanes Theater. Erfahrungen, Konzepte. Essays. Köln 1972

Plays 

 Mensch Meier oder Das Glücksrad, 1959
 Variationen für zwei Schauspieler, 1960
 Sophie Imperator, 1961
 Drei, 1962
 Scherenschnitt oder Der Mörder sind Sie (Shear Madness), 1963
 Spielautomat, 1967
 Mascha, Mischa und Mai. Stage-play for children, 1968
 Börsenspiel, 1970
 Kontaktprogramm, 1971
 Interaktionen, 1971
 Test Test Test, 1972
 Polizeistunde, 1975
 Halt Dich da raus, 1975
 Tierspiel, 1978

Radio plays 

 Was sagen Sie zu Erwin Mauss? Einkreisung eines dicken Mannes. NDR 1968
 Scherben bringen Glück. WDR 1970
 Alea. WDR/BR/SDR 1969 / 1971
 Dadaphon. Hommage à Dada. WDR 1974
 Comeback. Portrait einer Frau die singt. SR/NDR/BR 1977
 Einmischung erbeten. HR 1977
 Blitzlicht. HR 1980
 Radio-Erinnerungen. NDR 1983

Translations 

 Alfred Jarry: König Ubu. Zürich 1959
 Pablo Picasso, Jean Tardieu: Der Raum und die Flöte. Variationen zu 12 Zeichnungen. Zürich 1959
 Jean Tardieu: Kammertheater. Neuwied 1960
 André Frénaud: Quelle der Quellen. Neuwied 1962
 Jean Tardieu: Professor Froeppel. Köln 1966

External links 
 Literature by and about Paul Pörtner in the catalogue of Deutsche Nationalbibliothek
 Paul Pörtner in the German and English versions of the Internet Movie Database
 Reinhard Döhl über Paul Pörtner
 Porträt der Stadtverwaltung Wuppertal

1925 births
1984 deaths
Writers from Wuppertal
German editors
20th-century German translators
20th-century German novelists
20th-century German dramatists and playwrights
German male novelists
German male dramatists and playwrights
20th-century German male writers
German male non-fiction writers